The Spider Returns is a 1941 15-chapter Columbia movie serial based on the pulp magazine character The Spider. It was the fourteenth of the 57 serials released by Columbia and a sequel to their 1938 serial The Spider's Web. The first episode runs 32 minutes, while the other 14 are approximately 17 minutes each.

Plot
Amateur criminologist Richard Wentworth, formerly the masked vigilante, the Spider, brings his  former alter ego out of retirement for 15 action-packed chapters to help his old friend, police commissioner Kirk (Kirkpatrick in the pulp novels), battle a dangerous, power-obsessed maniac called the Gargoyle. This mysterious crime lord and his henchmen threaten the world with acts of sabotage and wholesale murder in an effort to wreck the National security of the United States.

Cast

 Warren Hull as The Spider / Richard Wentworth / Blinkey McQuade
 Mary Ainslee as Nita Van Sloan
 Dave O'Brien as Jackson 
 Joseph W. Girard as Commissioner Kirk
 Kenneth Duncan as Ram Singh
 Corbet Harris as McLeod/The Gargoyle
 Bryant Washburn as Westfall 
 Charles F. Miller as Mr. Van Sloan
 Anthony Warde as Trigger (henchmen)
 Harry Harvey as Stephan
 Forrest Taylor as Voice of The Gargoyle

Stunts

Chuck Hamilton
George Magrill
Ken Terrell
Dale Van Sickel

Production
Columbia Pictures used their original serial The Spider's Web as the basic template for many of its early serials: the daring hero and his assistants adopt disguises to battle an exotic, secretive villain and his lawless gang. In The Spider Returns, The Gargoyle wears robes which would not look out of place being worn by Flash Gordon's longtime nemesis Ming the Merciless.

Both serials feature a dramatic wardrobe enhancement to the Spider's original magazine appearance: his simple black cape and head mask are over-printed with a white spider's web pattern and then matched with his usual plain black fedora. This striking addition gave the silver screen Spider an appearance more like that of a traditional superhero, like other pulp and comics heroes being adapted for the era's movie serials; it also made the serial Spider look less like the very popular Street and Smith pulp hero The Shadow, which also had been produced by Columbia and starred Victor Jory.

James W. Horne, who had co-directed the first Spider serial, was in complete charge of the sequel. By this time, Horne was filling his serials with tongue-in-cheek melodramatics, ludicrous fight scenes (in which the hero fights six or more men, and wins), as well as ridiculous-looking machines. For this reason, action fans often dismissed The Spider Returns as an inferior serial; but others consider it one of Horne's best, and a worthy sequel. While The Spider does take on half-a-dozen henchmen at a time, he doesn't always come off the clear winner. Horne keeps the action fairly straight until the last chapter, when he inserts some obvious humor (two henchmen, exhausted from their fist-fight, haphazardly swing at each other and then collapse).

The action-filled screenplay employs a typical serial formula of fist-fights, gun battles, explosions, and car chases, not forgetting secret weapons, death traps, and hairbreadth escapes as The Gargoyle tries to steal some top secret plans. The Spider serials are unique in that The Spider is also sought by the police with the same vigor that he is sought by criminals. The one real difference between this and the first serial is the police know Wentworth goes undercover at times in disguise as petty criminal Blinky McQuade; they work with him following the leads he uncovers as McQuade.

Dave O'Brien, who had performed The Spider's acrobatic stunts in The Spider's Web, is now a full-fledged second lead playing the role of Wentworth's assistant. This appearance led to a starring role in Columbia's later serial, Captain Midnight. Only three of the main participants in The Spider's Web (Warren Hull, Kenne Duncan, and Dave O'Brien) are on hand for this sequel.

Chapter titles

 The Stolen Plans
 The Fatal Time-Bomb
 The Secret Meeting
 The Smoke Dream
 The Gargoyle's Trail
 The X-Ray Eye
 The Radio Boomerang
 The Mysterious Message
 The Cup of Doom
 The X-Ray Belt
 Lips Sealed by Murder
 A Money Bomb
 Almost a Confession
 Suspicious Telegrams
 The Payoff
Source:

Distribution
Although the serial was not released in the UK, a feature version of about 80 minutes running time did appear there in 1943.

See also
List of film serials by year
List of film serials by studio

References

External links

 
 
 The Spider Returns at Movie Serial Experience

1941 films
1940s superhero films
American black-and-white films
Columbia Pictures film serials
1940s English-language films
American sequel films
American superhero films
Films directed by James W. Horne
Films based on American novels
Films based on thriller novels
1941 adventure films
1941 crime films
American adventure films
Films with screenplays by Harry L. Fraser
Films with screenplays by George H. Plympton
1940s American films